Eric Gerald Howard (born September 5, 1993) is a Canadian rugby union player. He plays as a hooker for the NOLA Gold of Major League Rugby (MLR) and the Canadian national team.

Howard started his rugby career with the Ottawa Beavers, before joining the Brantford Harlequins in 2014.

In 2017, he signed for the New Orleans Gold team who play in the professional Major League Rugby competition, later going on to captain the team in the 2019 Major League Rugby season.

Club statistics

References

1993 births
Living people
Canadian expatriate rugby union players
Canadian expatriate sportspeople in the United States
Expatriate rugby union players in the United States
New Orleans Gold players
Rugby union hookers
Sportspeople from Ottawa
Canada international rugby union players
Canadian rugby union players